RC-31 or Bahour-Karaimedu Road branches out from RC-18 at Bahour and ends at Karaimedu.

References

External links
 Official website of Public Works Department, Puducherry UT

State highways in Puducherry
Transport in Puducherry